The Himmelfahrtskirche (Church of the Ascension) is a Protestant church in the Leuben district of Dresden. It was designed by Karl Emil Scherz and completed in 1901, replacing the Alte Kirche. It is a listed monument.

References 

Churches in Dresden